Mote de queso is a Colombian soup dish. It is originally from the country's Atlantic coast and is made with ñame (yam) and Costeño cheese. It is eaten in the Caribbean area of Colombia and is a traditional dish of Sincelejo and Montería.

See also

Suero
Queso costeño

References

Colombian cuisine
Cheese soups